The 1992 Sportscar World Championship season was the 40th and final season of FIA World Sportscar Championship motor racing. It featured the 1992 FIA Sportscar World Championship, which was contested over a six race series which ran from 26 April to 18 October 1992. The championship was open to Group C Sportscars.

The Drivers Championship was won jointly by Yannick Dalmas and Derek Warwick and the Teams Championship by Peugeot Talbot Sport. The FIA Cup for Drivers was awarded to Ferdinand de Lesseps and the FIA Cup for Teams to Chamberlain Engineering.

Pre-season
From the start, the 1992 season was in doubt.  The FIA planned to cancel the season due to a lack of entrants, but pressure from Peugeot, who had poured a large sum of money into the sport and did not wish to see that money wasted after only a year of competition, convinced the FIA that there would be enough entries to make the season worthwhile.  With this, the FIA allowed the season to move forward.

The FIA's vision of a single unified formula for the Sportscar World Championship that would truly equal that of Formula One was finally into place following the development of 3500 cc sportscars in the previous seasons.  This formula of engine equalisation took over the series, eliminating any previous engine that did not fit into the 3.5 L category.  Thus every car had similar engines, and new subclasses were born: C1 for works supported teams with engines of 10 or 12 cylinders and usually backed by factory teams, and FIA Cup for privateer teams, usually running the Ford Cosworth DFR V8. FIA Cup cars were required to conform with Group C regulations with the exceptions of a lower prescribed minimum weight (700 kg v 750 kg), a limitation on engine revolutions and the prohibition of carbon disc brakes. 

With the elimination of the previous C2 class, it required manufacturers such as Mazda and Porsche to build entirely new engines, and due to the large change in engine dimensions compared to what they had used in 1991, all new chassis as well.  Porsche already had an F1 engine in their 3512 unit used by Footwork, but the engine design was found to be lacking.  Porsche, suffering financially at the time, decided that it was no longer worth not only improving the 3512, but also replacing the 962 chassis, and decided not to return.

Mazda, having accomplished their goal of winning the 24 Hours of Le Mans in 1991 with their famed rotary engine, were left without the ability to use their rotary engine anymore in 1992.  Since Mazda entered sportscar racing mostly to push their rotary designs, Mazda decided to continue on into 1992 for advancement of the overall brand, but with a less ambitious development programme.  Mazdaspeed bought customer versions of the Jaguar XJR-14 and slightly modified them into the Mazda MXR-01 while the engines were customer Judd GV V10s.  This effort saved large amounts of money for the company while keeping their name involved in the sport.

Of the teams that already had compliant 3.5 L cars racing in 1991, their continuation into 1992 varied.

Mercedes-Benz, alongside partner Sauber, pushed ahead with plans for a car in 1992.  Development of the C292 was underway, as was construction of a new set of Flat-12s.  However, after various faults in the construction of the engines in 1991, further problems led to large monetary losses for the company, forcing them not to return for 1992.

Jaguar, who had been in sportscar racing with the XJR project since 1984, and were not completely happy with the performance of the XJR-14 during the 1991 season, had already announced their departure from the series.  Customer XJR-14s were promised for 1992 from newcomers RMR racing as well as Gee Pee Cars.

Of the smaller privateer teams, Brun Motorsport's development of the lacking C91 chassis cost them a great deal, and with the loss of cheap customer cars like the Porsche 962, they decided not to return.  Other teams which had previously used the 962 also failed to return, including Kremer Racing and Team Salamin Primagaz.  Courage Compétition was unable to find the money to continue development of their own chassis, and decided to instead concentrate solely on the 24 Hours of Le Mans. Konrad Motorsport, whose KM-011 chassis was also lackluster in 1991, claimed they were attempting to push on with Lamborghini backing into 1992.  Euro Racing found enough cash to replace their ageing Spice chassis with the new Lola T92/10s with Judd powerplants, and promised to be on the grid immediately for 1992. Chamberlain Engineering also planned to continue as the factory backed Spice Engineering squad.

Peugeot and Toyota, who had campaigned their 905 and TS010s respectively, remained in the sport mostly unchanged.  Both cars underwent evolutionary changes in preparation for 1992, while the basic chassis and engines remained the same.

A revival of the BRM name was also announced for 1992, using their own newly built P351 chassis and V12 engine.  Unfortunately, even with the apparent addition of BRM, the grid in comparison between 1991 and 1992 was looking bleak, with the loss of a large number of privateer teams, as well as the loss of two major manufacturers (with a third being downgraded to privateer status) with only one possible new replacement.

Schedule
When the 1992 season was provisionally approved in December 1991, the FIA published a ten race calendar for the season, composed of 1000 km and 500 km races, as well as the 24 Hours of Le Mans.

Initial schedule

By January 1992, the FIA shortened the calendar to eight events, with the Monza and Donington events being cut down to 500 km.  Magny-Cours was also brought in to replace some fly-away events.

The Jerez round remained on the final calendar, but was cancelled during the middle of the season when track officials failed to update the track to the FIA's standards.

Final schedule

Prior to the BRDC Empire Trophy at Silverstone, race organisers attempted to convince teams to shorten the race distance to approximately 250 km in order to boost ticket sales.  However, Toyota vetoed the decision and the race remained at its original distance.

Entries

Group C1

FIA Cup

Results and standings

Race results

Points system
Points were awarded on the following basis: 

In order to be classified for points, a car had to complete 90% of the winner's distance.  Further, drivers were required to complete at least 30% of their car's total race distance to qualify for championship points.

Drivers' World Championship

FIA Cup for Drivers
For the Suzuka round Chamberlain Engineering were the only team to enter the race so no points were awarded in the category.

Teams' World Championship
{|
|

FIA Cup for Teams
For the Suzuka round Chamberlain Engineering were the only team to enter the race so no points were awarded in the category.

Post-season

Although in preparation for the 1992 season there showed some potential of allowing the championship to survive through to future seasons, especially with promises from Peugeot, as the season went on it became apparent that some of this potential was merely false hope.  The customer Jaguars never showed, even though they continued to be promised even as the season went on.  Konrad's Lamborghini powered sportscar was also never raced after promises of continued development.  BRM's effort only resulted in them racing once, at Le Mans, where they finished last after completing only 20 laps.  After Le Mans, they simply stopped showing up.  The season thus became simply a showing of Peugeot dominance due to the large amount of money they had poured into the 905 project.

Thus hope for 1993 was slim.  Resting on the promises of Peugeot as well as Nissan who claimed they were returning to the series with their P35, the FIA tentatively announced that the 1993 season would occur.  However, following Nissan's decision to cancel the P35 due to economic difficulties, and with a lack of entries announcing their participation, the FIA cancelled the 1993 season.  This marked the end of 40 continuous years of the World Sportscar Championship, albeit in different guises.

Sportscar racing was left without a single unified championship in which to complete, leading to a large number of smaller breakaway series across the world.  The All Japan Sports Prototype Championship series in Japan was also unable to continue after 1992 as well, although Group C cars continued to participate as guests in other series.  IMSA's championships in North America continued on but also suffering from dwindling fields until it was replaced by the American Le Mans Series in 1999.  The FIA took over the European Sports Racing World Cup in 1999 to create the FIA Sportscar Championship in a fashion similar to the World Sportscar Championship, but it failed by 2003.

Following many rough years, by 2004 sportscar racing had become stable with the ACO's two main sportscar series, the European Le Mans Series and American Le Mans Series, with the Japan Le Mans Challenge to follow in 2006.  However, the Japan Le Mans Challenge was dissolved the same year. Then, in 2009 the ACO formed the Asian Le Mans Series. Finally, in 2010 ACO formed the Intercontinental Le Mans Cup a global championship, which was renamed FIA World Endurance Championship for 2012.

References

External links
 1992 Sportscar World Championship race results at www.classicscars.com
 1992 World Sportscar Championship Programmes, www.progcovers.com
 Appendix J for the International Sporting Code (including Sport Car technical regulations (Group C)), 1992 FIA Yearbook of Automobile Sport, historicdb.fia.com, as archived at web.archive.org

 
World Sportscar Championship seasons
Sports